Sofya Levitina was a Soviet actress.

Selected filmography 
 1924 — Aelita
 1934 — Boule de Suif
 1944 — The Wedding

References

External links 
 СОФЬЯ ЛЕВИТИНА on kino-teatr.ru

Soviet actresses
1877 births
1950 deaths